The Walla Walla Council (1855) was a meeting in the Pacific Northwest between the United States and sovereign tribal nations of the Cayuse, Nez Perce, Umatilla, Walla Walla, and Yakama. The council occurred on May 29 – June 11; the treaties signed at this council on June 9 were ratified by the U.S. Senate four years later in 1859.

These treaties codified the constitutional relationship between the people living on the Nez Perce, Umatilla, and Yakama reservations; it was one of the earliest treaties obtained in the Pacific Northwest.

Washington Territory's first governor Isaac I. Stevens secured this treaty, allowing larger portions of the land to be given to the two largest and most powerful tribes: Yakama and Nez Perce; these reservations encompassed most of their traditional hunting grounds. The smaller tribes moved to the smaller of the three reservations. Stevens was able to acquire  of land.

See also
Yakima War (1855–58)
Palouse War (1858)
Nez Perce War (1877)

Notes

External links 

Stevens Treaty Council of 1855 centennial records at the Whitman College and Northwest Archives, Whitman College.

United States and Native American treaties
History of Washington (state)
1855 treaties
1859 treaties
1855 conferences